Checkland is a surname, and may refer to:

 Francis Checkland (born 1897), English footballer
 Michael Checkland (born 1936), Director-General of the BBC
 Olive Checkland (1920–2004), English historian and writer
 Peter Checkland (born 1930), British management scientist 
 Sydney Checkland (1916–1986), British-Canadian economic historian